Västra Götaland County West  is one of the 29 multi-member constituencies of the Riksdag, the national legislature of Sweden. The constituency was established as Gothenburg and Bohus County in 1970 when the Riksdag changed from a bicameral legislature to a unicameral legislature. It was renamed Bohus County in 1973. It was renamed Västra Götaland County West in 1998 when the counties of Älvsborg, Gothenburg and Bohus and Skaraborg were merged to create Västra Götaland. The constituency currently consists of the municipalities of Ale, Alingsås, Härryda, Kungälv, Lerum, Lilla Edet, Mölndal, Öckerö, Partille, Stenungsund and Tjörn. The constituency currently elects 11 of the 349 members of the Riksdag using the open party-list proportional representation electoral system. At the 2022 general election it had 285,927 registered electors.

Electoral system
Västra Götaland County West currently elects 11 of the 349 members of the Riksdag using the open party-list proportional representation electoral system. Constituency seats are allocated using the modified Sainte-Laguë method. Only parties that that reach the 4% national threshold and parties that receive at least 12% of the vote in the constituency compete for constituency seats. Supplementary leveling seats may also be allocated at the constituency level to parties that reach the 4% national threshold.

Election results

Summary

(Excludes leveling seats)

Detailed

2020s

2022
Results of the 2022 general election held on 11 September 2022:

The following candidates were elected:
 Constituency seats - Anders Ådahl (C), 588 votes; Alexander Christiansson (SD), 127 votes; Rashid Farivar (SD), 56 votes; Aylin Fazelian (S), 946 votes; Kenneth G. Forslund (S), 1,228 votes; Helena Gellerman (L), 493 votes; Joakim Järrebring (S), 749 votes; Ellen Juntti (M), 427 votes; Roland Utbult (KD), 785 votes; Camilla Waltersson Grönvall (M), 1,240 votes; and Jessica Wetterling (V), 840 votes.
 Leveling seats - Janine Alm Ericson (MP), 418 votes; Yasmine Eriksson (SD), 141 votes; and Johanna Rantsi (M), 839 votes.

2010s

2018
Results of the 2018 general election held on 9 September 2018:

The following candidates were elected:
 Constituency seats - Aron Emilsson (SD), 83 votes; Aylin Fazelian (S), 1,005 votes; Kenneth G. Forslund (S), 1,272 votes; Helena Gellerman (L), 729 votes; Joakim Järrebring (S), 934 votes; Ellen Juntti (M), 1,032 votes; Annika Qarlsson (C), 733 votes; Charlotte Quensel (SD), 1 vote, Roland Utbult (KD), 645 votes; Camilla Waltersson Grönvall (M), 1,213 votes; and Jessica Wetterling (V), 997 votes.
 Leveling seats - Janine Alm Ericson (MP), 552 votes; and Sofia Westergren (M), 1,011 votes.

2014
Results of the 2014 general election held on 14 September 2014:

The following candidates were elected:
 Constituency seats - Catharina Bråkenhielm (S), 1,346 votes; Fredrik Christensson (C), 1,054 votes; Kenneth G. Forslund (S), 979 votes; Ellen Juntti (M), 717 votes; Jan-Olof Larsson (S), 1,647 votes; Emma Nohrén (MP), 1,225 votes; Maria Plass (M), 722 votes; Lars-Arne Staxäng (M), 1,521 votes; Lars Tysklind (FP), 721 votes; Roland Utbult (KD), 1,556 votes; and Tony Wiklander (SD), 1 vote.
 Leveling seats - Wiwi-Anne Johansson (V), 457 votes.

2010
Results of the 2010 general election held on 19 September 2010:

The following candidates were elected:
 Constituency seats - Catharina Bråkenhielm (S), 1,388 votes; Stefan Caplan (M), 1,255 votes; Tina Ehn (MP), 798 votes; Kenneth G. Forslund (S), 942 votes; Ellen Juntti (M), 1,046 votes; Jan-Olof Larsson (S), 1,628 votes; Maria Plass (M), 1,537 votes; Johnny Skalin (SD), 2 votes; Lars-Arne Staxäng (M), 2,464 votes; Åsa Torstensson (C), 1,510 votes; Lars Tysklind (FP), 1,014 votes; and Roland Utbult (KD), 2,709 votes.
 Leveling seats - Wiwi-Anne Johansson (V), 490 votes.

2000s

2006
Results of the 2006 general election held on 17 September 2006:

The following candidates were elected:
 Constituency seats - Catharina Bråkenhielm (S), 1,290 votes; Birgitta Eriksson (S), 599 votes; Kenneth G. Forslund (S), 1,064 votes; Jan-Olof Larsson (S), 1,409 votes; Kent Olsson (M), 326 votes; Maria Plass (M), 957 votes; Inger René (M), 612 votes; Rosita Runegrund (KD), 1,090 votes; Lars-Arne Staxäng (M), 2,254 votes; Åsa Torstensson (C), 1,735 votes; and Lars Tysklind (FP), 830 votes.
 Leveling seats - Tina Ehn (MP), 510 votes; and Wiwi-Anne Johansson (V), 416 votes.

2002
Results of the 2002 general election held on 15 September 2002:

The following candidates were elected:
 Constituency seats - Marita Aronson (FP), 3,084 votes; Lars Bäckström (V), 1,253 votes; Mona Berglund Nilsson (S), 2,024 votes; Catharina Bråkenhielm (S), 1,242 votes; Kenneth G. Forslund (S), 1,799 votes; Jan-Olof Larsson (S), 1,880 votes; Lennart Nilsson (S), 3,269 votes; Kent Olsson (M), 913 votes; Inger René (M), 1,423 votes; Rosita Runegrund (KD), 2,314 votes; and Lars Tysklind (FP), 681 votes.
 Leveling seats - Mona Jönsson (MP), 524 votes; and Åsa Torstensson (C), 2,598 votes.

1990s

1998
Results of the 1998 general election held on 20 September 1998:

The following candidates were elected:
 Constituency seats - Berit Adolfsson (M), 1,142 votes; Lars Bäckström (V), 1,915 votes; Mona Berglund Nilsson (S), 1,661 votes; Lisbet Calner (S), 2,037 votes; Åke Carnerö (KD), 1,275 votes; Märta Johansson (S), 1,216 votes; Lennart Nilsson (S), 3,159 votes; Kent Olsson (M), 1,317 votes; Inger René (M), 2,573 votes; Rosita Runegrund (KD), 1,122 votes; and Kenth Skårvik (FP), 1,032 votes.
 Leveling seats - Per Lager (MP), 663 votes; and Åsa Torstensson (C), 1,016 votes.

1994
Results of the 1994 general election held on 18 September 1994:

1991
Results of the 1991 general election held on 15 September 1991:

1980s

1988
Results of the 1988 general election held on 18 September 1988:

1985
Results of the 1985 general election held on 15 September 1985:

1982
Results of the 1982 general election held on 19 September 1982:

1970s

1979
Results of the 1979 general election held on 16 September 1979:

1976
Results of the 1976 general election held on 19 September 1976:

1973
Results of the 1973 general election held on 16 September 1973:

1970
Results of the 1970 general election held on 20 September 1970:

References

Riksdag constituencies
Riksdag constituencies established in 1970
Riksdag constituency, West